Frank Edward Ford  (9 July 1902 – 26 November 1976) was the Archdeacon of the East Riding from 1957  to 1970.

Ford  was educated at Lancing College and Hertford College, Oxford. He was ordained after a period of study at Westcott House, Cambridge and ordained in 1928. After a  curacy at St Chrysotom Victoria Park, Manchester he worked for Toc H  in various capacities  from 1929 to 1940.  He held incumbencies at St John Newland and St Thomas, Scarborough before his Archdeacon’s appointment; and Bainton afterwards.

References

1902 births
People educated at Lancing College
Alumni of Westcott House, Cambridge
Archdeacons of the East Riding
1976 deaths
Alumni of Hertford College, Oxford